Croome is a hamlet in the East Riding of Yorkshire, England. It lies just to the north of the B1253 road at Sledmere.

It forms part of the civil parish of Sledmere.

References

External links

Hamlets in the East Riding of Yorkshire